There are several real or apparent name conflicts between different Solar System bodies, in spite of efforts to give every named body a distinct name. Most of these conflicts are between asteroids and natural satellites of planets, which are named according to different but partially overlapping schemes. Most satellites are named after people and divinities in Greek and Roman mythology; this is rarely true of asteroids currently, with the exception of centaurs and Jupiter trojans, but formerly many asteroids had mythological names, which consequently came into conflict with the names of natural satellites.

Bodies with identical names and referents
Some of these bodies have exactly the same name, referring to the same mythological character.  The earliest such conflicts possibly arose through not considering certain mythological names as "official"; for instance, the names Io, Europa, Ganymede and Callisto for the Galilean satellites of Jupiter were not used in astronomical literature of a certain era, their place being taken by Jupiter I, Jupiter II, Jupiter III, Jupiter IV (cf. Naming of moons).

Moon named first
In the earliest of these conflicts, the natural satellite was named first, and the conflict arose with the naming of an asteroid.  These conflicts span the period 1858–1906.

Europa, a moon of Jupiter, named 1614 and 52 Europa, discovered 1858
Io, a moon of Jupiter, named 1614 and 85 Io, discovered 1865
Dione, a moon of Saturn, named 1847 and 106 Dione, discovered 1868
Rhea, a moon of Saturn, named 1847 and 577 Rhea, discovered 1905
Titania, a moon of Uranus, named 1852 and 593 Titania, discovered 1906

Asteroid named first
Later conflicts arose in relatively recent times from giving newly discovered satellites the same names as those of asteroids.  By this time, it was possibly felt that the true name of an asteroid such as "38 Leda" included its minor planet number, and so re-using the name for a satellite did not really create a conflict.  These conflicts span the period 1975–2001, though some conflicts of this type had arisen earlier with some names used unofficially.

9 Metis, discovered 1848 and Metis, a moon of Jupiter, named 1983.
24 Themis, discovered 1853 and Themis, named 1905. The latter Themis was a supposed moon of Saturn that turned out not to exist.
38 Leda, discovered 1856 and Leda, a moon of Jupiter, named 1975.
55 Pandora, discovered 1858 and Pandora, a moon of Saturn, named 1985. 
74 Galatea, discovered 1862 and Galatea, a moon of Neptune, discovered 1989. 
113 Amalthea, discovered 1871 and Amalthea, a moon of Jupiter, discovered 1892; the name was suggested by Camille Flammarion shortly after its discovery, but it was not officially named until 1975.
171 Ophelia, discovered 1877 and Ophelia, a moon of Uranus, discovered 1986.
239 Adrastea, discovered 1884 and Adrastea, a moon of Jupiter, named in 1983. Adrastea was also an unofficial name for Jupiter's moon Ananke (1955–1975).
666 Desdemona, discovered 1908 and Desdemona, a moon of Uranus, discovered 1986.
1810 Epimetheus, discovered 1960 and Epimetheus a moon of Saturn, named 1983.
1809 Prometheus, discovered 1960 and Prometheus, a moon of Saturn, named 1985.
2758 Cordelia, discovered 1978 and Cordelia, a moon of Uranus, discovered 1986.
4450 Pan, discovered 1987 and Pan, a moon of Saturn, discovered 1990. Pan was also an unofficial name for Jupiter's moon Carme (1955–1975).
10386 Romulus, discovered 1996 and Romulus, a moon of Sylvia, discovered 2001.

Bodies with identical names and different referents
Some bodies have names of identical form, but were actually named for different persons or things.

218 Bianca discovered 1880, was named after opera singer Bianca Bianchi and Bianca, a moon of Uranus, discovered 1986, was named after a Shakespeare character.
1162 Larissa, discovered 1930, was named for the Thessalian town Larissa and Larissa, a moon of Neptune, discovered 1981, was named after the nymph Larissa.

Bodies with similar names and the same referent
Some objects have names that refer to the same mythological character, but slight variations in spelling prevent there from being a technical conflict.

Moon named first
 Callisto, a moon of Jupiter, named 1614 and 204 Kallisto, discovered 1879, both variant transliterations of the name of the nymph Callisto.
 Ganymede, a moon of Jupiter, named 1614 and 1036 Ganymed, discovered 1924, both named for Zeus' cupbearer.  The name in Latin is Ganymedes, of which Ganymede is an English form and Ganymed a German one. The names are therefore in full conflict in German.

Asteroid named first
 53 Kalypso, discovered 1858 and Calypso, a moon of Saturn, named 1983, both named for the Atlantid nymph Calypso.
 548 Kressida, discovered 1904 and Cressida, a moon of Uranus, discovered 1986, both named after Cressida, a heroine in English-language versions of the Troy legend (in the case of the moon of Uranus, by way of Shakespeare). 
 101 Helena, discovered 1868 and Helene, a moon of Saturn, named 1988, both named after Helen of Troy.
 657 Gunlöd, discovered 1908 and Gunnlod, a moon of Saturn, named 2022, both named after Norse giantess Gunnlöð

 899 Jokaste, discovered 1918 and Iocaste, a moon of Jupiter, named 2002, both named for Queen Jocasta of Thebes.

 763 Cupido, discovered 1913 and Cupid, a moon of Uranus, discovered 2003, after the Roman god Cupid.  Cupido is the Latin form, Cupid a modification of the same used in English.  The name of the moon Cupid specifically refers to Cupid appearing as a character in the play Timon of Athens.
 3908 Nyx, discovered 1980 and Nix, a moon of Pluto, named 2006, both named for Nyx, goddess of night.
 1865 Cerberus, discovered 1971 and Kerberos, a moon of Pluto, named 2013, both named for Cerberus, canine guardian of the underworld.

Both moons
 Herse, a moon of Jupiter discovered 2003, and Ersa, a moon of Jupiter discovered 2018, both named after the goddess Ersa (the Greek goddess of dew).

Both asteroids
 26 Proserpina, discovered 1853 and 399 Persephone, discovered 1895, both named for Persephone, goddess of the underworld.
 68 Leto, discovered 1861 and 639 Latona, discovered 1907. Named for Leto, mother of Apollo and Artemis.
 161 Athor, discovered 1876 and 2340 Hathor, discovered 1976, both named for the Egyptian goddess Hathor.
 1068 Nofretete, discovered 1926 and 3199 Nefertiti, discovered 1982, both named for the Egyptian queen Nefertiti.
 1143 Odysseus, discovered 1930, and 5254 Ulysses, discovered 1986, named for the Greek warrior Odysseus.
 2155 Wodan, discovered 1960 and 3989 Odin, discovered 1986, variant names of the Germanic god Wodanaz.

Bodies with similar names and different referents
 558 Carmen, discovered 1905, and Carme, discovered 1938.
 832 Karin, discovered 1916, and Kari, discovered 2006.
 1131 Porzia, discovered 1929, named for Porcia Catonis, wife of Marcus Junius Brutus; and Portia, a moon of Uranus, discovered 1986, named for the character Portia in William Shakespeare's play The Merchant of Venice.
 9313 Protea, discovered 1988, and Proteus, discovered 1989.
 9986 Hirokun, discovered 1996, and Hyrrokkin, discovered 2004.
 98 Ianthe, discovered 1868, 411 Xanthe, discovered 1896, and Anthe, a moon of Saturn discovered 2007.

Bodies with different names and the same referent
Several bodies have completely distinct names, but may be confused because their names refer to the same thing or the same mythological character.  This is usually true when one name is Latin and another Greek, and causes special confusion in Greek, where the Greek forms of all mythological names are used in preference to the Latin names.

Conflicts with non-minor or Solar System bodies
Some of the conflicts, surprisingly enough, are with planets and satellites, or other astronomical objects with long-established names.
 The Sun and Helium, discovered 1868, and 895 Helio, discovered 1918.
 The Moon and Phoebe, discovered 1898, and 580 Selene, discovered 1905.
 Earth and 1184 Gaea, discovered 1926.
 Venus and 1388 Aphrodite, discovered 1935, and 7088 Ishtar, discovered 1992.
 Mercury and 69230 Hermes, named 1937 (but not numbered until 2003).
 Neptune, discovered 1846 and 4341 Poseidon, discovered 1987. Poseidon was also an unofficial name for Jupiter's moon Pasiphae 1955–1975.
 Jupiter and 5731 Zeus, discovered 1988.
 Uranus and 30 Urania, discovered 1854. Uranus, however, is mostly named after the Greek god personifying the sky.
 Maia (20 Tauri) and 66 Maja, discovered 1861.
 Merope (23 Tauri) and 1051 Merope, discovered 1925.
 There was a potential conflict between Saturn and Cronus, a suggested name for Pluto, discovered 1930. "Kronos" is also a nickname for the star HD 240430.
 10 Hygiea, discovered 1849, and Valetudo, a moon of Jupiter discovered 2018. Named for Hygieia (Valetudo in Roman mythology), the goddess of personal healing.
 There was also a potential conflict between Hades, an unofficial name for Sinope, a moon of Jupiter between 1955 and 1975, and Pluto.
 Vulcan, a hypothetical planet once proposed to exist in an orbit between Mercury and the Sun, and 2212 Hephaistos, discovered 1978.
 Theia, a planet supposed to have collided with the early Earth, producing the Moon as a result, and 106 Dione, discovered 1868, and 405 Thia, discovered 1895. The equivalence between Dione and Thia is less certain.
 Tyche, a hypothetical planet residing in the Oort cloud whose existence was ruled out in 2014, and 19 Fortuna, discovered 1852, and 258 Tyche, discovered 1886.

Conflicts among asteroids
Other conflicts occurred between asteroids discovered earlier and those discovered later.

 1 Ceres, discovered 1801 and 1108 Demeter, discovered 1929. Demeter was also an unofficial name for Jupiter's moon Lysithea 1955–1975. Named for the goddess Demeter. (In Greek, both objects are named Demeter, as 1 Ceres was discovered at a time when new "planets" were being named in Greek after the Greek equivalents of the Latin mythological names they were given upon discovery. As a result, 1 Ceres was given the Modern Greek name Δήμητρα (Dēmētra). Later, when 1108 was discovered and named, to avoid conflict it was given the Ancient Greek form, Δημήτηρ (Dēmētēr).)
 2 Pallas, named 1802, 93 Minerva, discovered 1867, and 881 Athene, discovered 1917.  It might be argued that "Pallas" here does not actually refer to the goddess Athene, but rather her mythological companion Pallas; however, in the 19th century "Pallas" was commonly used as shorthand for "Pallas Athene", and in the company of Ceres, Juno, and Vesta, it seems more likely that Athene was intended.
 3 Juno, discovered 1804 and 103 Hera, discovered 1868. Hera was also an unofficial name for Jupiter's moon Elara 1955–1975.  Named for the goddess Hera.
 4 Vesta, discovered 1807 and 46 Hestia, discovered 1857. Hestia was also an unofficial name for Jupiter's moon Himalia 1955–1975.  Named for the goddess Hestia.
 5 Astraea, discovered 1845, 24 Themis, discovered 1853, 99 Dike, discovered 1868, and 269 Justitia, discovered 1887.  Named for goddesses of [[Lady Justice|
 8 Flora, discovered 1847 and 410 Chloris, discovered 1896. Named for the goddess of flowers. Cf. Flora and Chloris.
 12 Victoria, discovered 1850 and 307 Nike, discovered 1891. Named for the goddess of victory. Cf. Nike and Victoria.
 78 Diana, discovered 1863 and 105 Artemis, discovered 1868 and 395 Delia and 15992 Cynthia.  These names all refer to the goddess Artemis, the last two being epithets derived from placenames associated with the goddess.
 94 Aurora, discovered 1867 and 221 Eos discovered 1882.  Named for the goddess of the dawn.
 424 Gratia discovered 1896 and 627 Charis discovered 1907. Named for any one of the Graces.
 14 Irene, discovered 1851 and 679 Pax, discovered 1909. Named for the goddess of peace.
 433 Eros, discovered 1898 and 763 Cupido, discovered 1913 and 1221 Amor discovered 1932, the first being the Greek, and the second and third Latin renditions of the name of Eros, the god of love.
 2063 Bacchus, discovered 1977 and 3671 Dionysus, discovered 1984, named for the god of wine.
 1125 China, discovered 1957 and 3789 Zhongguo, discovered 1928, named for China.
 14335 Alexosipov, discovered 1981 and 152217 Akosipov, discovered 2005, named for astronomer Aleksandr Osipov.

See also
 Naming of moons

References

 
Astronomical nomenclature